The 1936 United States presidential election in South Dakota took place on November 3, 1936, as part of the 1936 United States presidential election. Voters chose four representatives, or electors to the Electoral College, who voted for president and vice president.

South Dakota voted for the Democratic candidate Franklin D. Roosevelt over Republican candidate Alf Landon. Roosevelt won the state by a margin of 11.53%. , this is the last occasion when the following counties have voted for a Democratic Presidential candidate: Douglas, Fall River, Haakon, Harding, Hughes and Perkins.

Background

Primary elections

Democratic primary

Incumbent President Franklin D. Roosevelt ran unopposed in the Democratic primary, held on May 5, 1936.

Republican primary

U.S. Senator William Borah from Idaho and former South Dakota Governor Warren E. Green (leading a "No Preference" delegate list) faced off in the Republican primary, held on May 5, 1936.

General election
The general election was held on November 3, 1936. Armstrong County did not participate.

Results by county

See also
 United States presidential elections in South Dakota

Notes

References

South Dakota
1936
1936 South Dakota elections